Gennady Varfolomeyevich Garbuzov (11 September 1930 – 21 October 2009) was a Russian bantamweight boxer. He won a Soviet title in 1951 and an Olympic bronze medal in 1952.

1952 Olympic results
Below are the results of Gennady Garbuzov, a bantamweight boxer from the Soviet Union who competed at the 1952 Helsinki Olympics:

 Round of 32: defeated Jean Renard (Belgium) by decision, 2-1
 Round of 16: defeated Raul Macias Guevara (Mexico) by decision, 3-0
 Quarterfinal: defeated Frantisek Majdlock (Czechoslovakia) by decision, 3-0
 Semifinal: lost to Pentti Hamalainen (Finland) by decision, 0-3 (was awarded bronze medal)

References

1930 births
2009 deaths
Soviet male boxers
Olympic boxers of the Soviet Union
Olympic bronze medalists for the Soviet Union
Boxers at the 1952 Summer Olympics
Olympic medalists in boxing
Russian male boxers
Medalists at the 1952 Summer Olympics
Bantamweight boxers